1976 in sports describes the year's events in world sport.

Alpine skiing
 Alpine Skiing World Cup
 Men's overall season champion: Ingemar Stenmark, Sweden
 Women's overall season champion: Rosi Mittermaier, West Germany

American football
 January 18 – Super Bowl X: the Pittsburgh Steelers (AFC) won 21−17 over the Dallas Cowboys (NFC)
 Location: Miami Orange Bowl
 Attendance: 80,187
 MVP: Lynn Swann, WR (Pittsburgh)
 Lee Roy Selmon is selected as the first overall pick in the NFL Draft. (April 8)
 Seattle Seahawks founded.
 Tampa Bay Buccaneers founded.
 Orange Bowl (1975 season):
 The Oklahoma Sooners won 14–6 over the Michigan Wolverines to win the college football national championship
 Tony Dorsett is awarded the Heisman Trophy (November 30).

Association football
 England – FA Cup – Southampton won 1–0 over Manchester United
 Stevenage F.C. were established
 Italy – Torino win Serie A for the first time since the Superga air disaster wiped out the team 27 years before.
 1976 European Championship – Czechoslovakia beat West Germany 5–3 on penalties to win, after the game had ended 2-2 after extra time.

Athletics
 July – Athletics at the 1976 Summer Olympics held at Montreal

Australian rules football
 Victorian Football League
 Hawthorn wins the 80th VFL Premiership (Hawthorn 13.22 (100) d North Melbourne 10.10 (70))
 Brownlow Medal awarded to Graham Moss (Essendon)

Baseball
 April 17 – Mike Schmidt of the Philadelphia Phillies hits four consecutive home runs in a game against the Chicago Cubs.
 April 25 – Chicago Cubs outfielder Rick Monday rescues an American flag just as two protesters are about to burn it in the outfield during a game at Dodger Stadium.
 Sparky Lyle of the New York Yankees breaks Hoyt Wilhelm's American League record of 154 career saves.
 World Series – The Cincinnati Reds (aka the "Big Red Machine") sweep the New York Yankees, 4 games to 0, to win their second straight championship.

Basketball
 NCAA Division I Men's Basketball Championship –
 Indiana wins 86–68 over Michigan
 NBA Finals –
 Boston Celtics win 4 games to 2 over the Phoenix Suns
 1976 ABA Playoffs –
 New York Nets defeat Denver Nuggets 4 games to 2
 American Basketball Association merges with the National Basketball Association.  Of the seven remaining teams in the ABA, the Virginia Squires fold, Kentucky Colonels and Spirits of St. Louis are bought out, and the remaining four teams (San Antonio Spurs, Denver Nuggets, New York Nets, and Indiana Pacers) join the NBA

Boxing
 May 22 – death of Oscar Bonavena (34), Argentinian heavyweight, who was shot in Reno, Nevada
 September 28 in Yankee Stadium, Bronx, New York Muhammad Ali won a controversial 15-round decision over Ken Norton to keep his World Heavyweight title.
 October 8 in São Paulo, Brazil, former world featherweight champion Eder Jofre fought his last fight, outpointing Mexico's Octavio (Famoso) Gomez in ten rounds.

Canadian football
 Grey Cup – Ottawa Rough Riders won 23–20 over the Saskatchewan Roughriders
 Vanier Cup – Western Ontario Mustangs won 29–13 over the Acadia Axemen

Cycling
 Giro d'Italia won by Felice Gimondi of Italy
 Tour de France – Lucien Van Impe of Belgium
 UCI Road World Championships – Men's road race – Freddy Maertens of Belgium

Dogsled racing
 Iditarod Trail Sled Dog Race Champion –
 Gerald Riley won with lead dogs: Puppy & Sugar

Field hockey
 Olympic Games (Men's Competition) in Montreal won by New Zealand
 Women's World Cup in Berlin won by West Germany

Figure skating
 World Figure Skating Championships –
 Men's champion: John Curry, Britain
 Ladies' champion: Dorothy Hamill, United States
 Pair skating champions: Irina Rodnina & Alexander Zaitsev, Soviet Union
 Ice dancing champions: Lyudmila Pakhomova & Alexandr Gorshkov, Soviet Union

Golf
Men's professional
 Masters Tournament – Raymond Floyd
 U.S. Open – Jerry Pate
 British Open – Johnny Miller
 PGA Championship – Dave Stockton
 PGA Tour money leader – Jack Nicklaus – $266,439
Men's amateur
 British Amateur – Dick Siderowf
 U.S. Amateur – Bill Sander
Women's professional
 LPGA Championship – Betty Burfeindt
 U.S. Women's Open – JoAnne Carner
 LPGA Tour money leader – Judy Rankin – $150,734, she is the first to ever earn more than $100,000 in a season.

Harness racing
 United States Pacing Triple Crown races –
 Cane Pace – Keystone Ore
 Little Brown Jug – Keystone Ore
 Messenger Stakes – Windshield Wiper
 United States Trotting Triple Crown races –
 Hambletonian – Steve Lobell
 Yonkers Trot – Steve Lobell
 Kentucky Futurity – Quick Pay
 Australian Inter Dominion Harness Racing Championship –
Pacers: Carclew
Trotters: Bay Johnny

Horse racing
Steeplechases
 Cheltenham Gold Cup – Royal Frolic
 Grand National – Rag Trade
Flat races
 Australia – Melbourne Cup won by Van der Hum
 Canada – Queen's Plate won by Norcliffe
 France – Prix de l'Arc de Triomphe won by Ivanjica
 Ireland – Irish Derby Stakes won by Malacate
 English Triple Crown Races:
 2,000 Guineas Stakes – Wollow
 The Derby – Empery
 St. Leger Stakes – Crow
 United States Triple Crown Races:
 Kentucky Derby – Bold Forbes
 Preakness Stakes – Elocutionist
 Belmont Stakes – Bold Forbes

Ice hockey
 Art Ross Trophy as the NHL's leading scorer during the regular season: Guy Lafleur, Montreal Canadiens
 Hart Memorial Trophy for the NHL's Most Valuable Player: Bobby Clarke – Philadelphia Flyers
 Stanley Cup – Montreal Canadiens win 4 games to 0 over the Philadelphia Flyers
 World Hockey Championship –
 Men's champion: Czechoslovakia defeated the Soviet Union
 Avco World Trophy – Winnipeg Jets win 4 games to 0 over the Houston Aeros
 NCAA Men's Ice Hockey Championship – University of Minnesota-Twin Cities Golden Gophers defeat Michigan Technological University Huskies 6–4 in Denver, Colorado

Motorsport

Rugby league
 29 June – the World Club Challenge concept is trialled as English champions St. Helens travel to Sydney to play Australian champions Eastern Suburbs. Easts defeat St Helens 25–2 in the one-off match.
 18 August – the 1976 Amco Cup tournament culminates in Balmain's 21–7 win over North Sydney in the final
 18 September – the 1976 NSWRFL season culminates in Manly-Warringah's 13–10 win over Parramatta in the Grand Final

Rugby union
 82nd Five Nations Championship series is won by Wales who complete the Grand Slam

Snooker
 World Snooker Championship – Ray Reardon beats Alex Higgins 27-16
 World rankings are introduced. Ray Reardon becomes the first world number one, for 1976/77.

Swimming
 July 18 to July 25 – XXI Olympic Games, held in Montreal
 August 14 – United States's Jonty Skinner sets the first official world record in the 50m freestyle in Philadelphia, clocking 23.86

Tennis
 Grand Slam in tennis men's results:
 Australian Open – Mark Edmondson
 French Open – Adriano Panatta
 Wimbledon championships – Björn Borg
 U.S. Open – Jimmy Connors
 Grand Slam in tennis women's results:
 Australian Open – Evonne Goolagong Cawley
 French Open – Sue Barker
 Wimbledon championships – Chris Evert
 U.S. Open – Chris Evert
 Davis Cup – Italy wins 4–1 over Chile in world tennis.

Water polo
 Water polo at the 1976 Summer Olympics in Montréal won by Hungary

General sporting events
 1976 Summer Olympics takes place in Montreal, Quebec, Canada
 USSR wins the most medals (125), and the most gold medals (49).
 1976 Winter Olympics takes place in Innsbruck, Austria
 USSR wins the most medals (27), and the most gold medals (13).
 Fifth Pan Arab Games held in Damascus, Syria

Awards
 Associated Press Male Athlete of the Year – Caitlyn Jenner (then Bruce), Track and field
 Associated Press Female Athlete of the Year – Nadia Comăneci, Gymnastics
 ABC's Wide World of Sports Athlete of the Year: Nadia Comăneci, Gymnastics

Notes

References

 
Sports by year